Ludwig des Coudres (10 May 1820, Kassel - 23 December 1878, Karlsruhe) was a German history and portrait painter. He also served as a Professor at the Academy of Fine Arts, Karlsruhe. His son,  Adolf Des Coudres, was a well-known landscape painter.

Biography 
The Des Coudres family originated in Switzerland. His father was the third-generation owner of a tapestry factory and died when Ludwig was only two years old. A family friend, Ludwig Hummel (1770-1840), Director of the Kunsthochschule Kassel, inspired him to begin drawing and painting.

In 1836, he began studying architecture at the new polytechnic school. The following year, he was able to begin studies at the Kunsthochschule, where his teacher was Ludwig Emil Grimm. Dissatisfied with the school's emphasis on the Nazarene style, he and two of his friends left to start their own studio and teach themselves. Shortly after, he had a change of heart and went to study at the Academy of Fine Arts, Munich, with Julius Schnorr von Carolsfeld. In 1843, he went to spend two years in Rome. There, he befriended Johann Wilhelm Schirmer who advised him to study with Karl Ferdinand Sohn and Wilhelm von Schadow at the Kunstakademie Düsseldorf. It was there he turned to portrait painting.

In 1854, with Schirmer's recommendation, he became the first Director of the Academy in Karlsruhe, organizing its operations and establishing the curriculum. Four years later, he married Elise von Reck, the daughter of an Oberst from Baden. In 1863, he was the author of an important work on copyright protection.

The following year, a fall on the ice resulted in serious injuries. He would die of an illness related to complications from the accident.

Notable works
Francesca da Rimini. 1850.
The Weeping Magdalen. 1852.
The Lamentation before the Burial (Carlsruhe Gallery). 1855.
The Adoration of the Shepherds (in possession of the Grand-Duke of Baden). 1857
The Holy Women before the Cross (in St. Nicholas, Hamburg). 1863.
Iphigeneia (in possession of the Grand-Duke of Baden). 1865.
Under the Red Cross. 1872.
Psyche and Pan.
Happy Existence — a child's picture.

Sources

Attribution:

External links

1820 births
1878 deaths
Artists from Kassel
People from the Electorate of Hesse
19th-century German painters
19th-century German male artists
Düsseldorf school of painting
German male painters